Penwood State Park is a public recreation area located on Talcott Mountain in the town of Bloomfield, Connecticut. The state park's  are contiguous with the north end of Talcott Mountain State Park. Both parks are managed by the Connecticut Department of Energy and Environmental Protection.

History
Penwood State Park was donated to the state in 1944 by Curtis H. Veeder, an industrialist (founder of Gilbarco Veeder-Root), inventor, and outdoorsperson. Veeder wished the property to "be kept in a natural state so that those who love nature may enjoy this property as I have enjoyed it." He blazed many of the original trails in the park; Lake Louise, a scenic kettle bog atop the ridge, was named after his wife.

Activities and amenities
The park offers picnic areas, numerous trails, and paved roads accessible by bike. The Metacomet Trail runs the entire length of the park.

References

External links
Penwood State Park Connecticut Department of Energy and Environmental Protection
Penwood State Park Map Connecticut Department of Energy and Environmental Protection

Bloomfield, Connecticut
State parks of Connecticut
Parks in Hartford County, Connecticut
Metacomet Ridge, Connecticut
Protected areas established in 1944
1944 establishments in Connecticut